Joseph Alan Jacobs (born September 21, 1970) is an American former NFL, Canadian Football League and Arena Football League offensive lineman/defensive lineman for the Charlotte Rage, Albany Firebirds and San Jose SaberCats. Married to Amber on September 21, 2001. They have twin sons Zach and Ryan and reside in Georgetown Texas.

High School Years
Jacobs attended Benicia High School in Benicia, California, and was an All-League and an All-America selection.

College years
Jacobs attended Utah State University, and was a letterman in football. In football, he was a two-time first-team All-Big West Conference selection and after his senior year, he participated in the East-West Shrine Game. Jacobs ranked 17th Top Pro Athletes Of All-Time. 
Utah State University: Ranking The Top 20 Pro Athletes Of All-Time | Fan Insider

1970 births
Living people
People from Benicia, California
Utah State Aggies football players
American football offensive linemen
American football defensive linemen
Charlotte Rage players
Albany Firebirds players
San Jose SaberCats players
Sportspeople from the San Francisco Bay Area
Players of American football from California